Dzmitry Barysavich Aharodnik (born 11 June 1978 in Zelva) is a retired Belarusian professional footballer. He made his professional debut in the Belarusian Premier League in 1995 for FC Dnepr Mogilev. He played 1 game in the 2002–03 UEFA Cup for FC Zenit St. Petersburg.

Career

Throughout his career, Aharodnik suffered many injuries.

Honours
Dnepr-Transmash Mogilev
 Belarusian Premier League champion: 1998.

References

1978 births
Living people
Belarusian footballers
Belarus international footballers
Belarusian Premier League players
Russian Premier League players
FC Zenit Saint Petersburg players
FC Metallurg Lipetsk players
FC Dynamo Saint Petersburg players
FC Kommunalnik Slonim players
FC Dnepr Mogilev players
FC Neman Grodno players
FC Veras Nesvizh players
Belarusian expatriate footballers
Expatriate footballers in Russia
Association football forwards